The Al-Hasan Mosque has a combination of ancient, traditional and modern Islamic art. It has 12 domes, two minarets, and the biggest mihrab in Bahrain. The mosque was built by Mohamed bin Yusuf Al-Hasan.

Structure 
The mosque was designed by Turkish architects and completed in 2018. The two conical minarets are Ottoman style and 55 meters tall so as to be visible from a distance. The total number of domes is 12. The main dome is surrounded by 4 medium-sized domes and below them are 7 smaller domes. All domes are made of fiberglass, made in the UAE. The doors were made in India of teak wood. The carpet and 21 chandeliers were made in Turkey. 

The mosque includes two prayer halls, a Qur'an center, two function halls, a media center and housing for the imam, the muadhin, cleaners and workers. It can accommodate 2000 worshippers in the prayer halls and in the porticos.    

The mihrab (prayer niche) is in the Egyptian style and was made by Egyptian engineers and specialists.

Tourism 
Besides being a place of worship, the mosque started tours for people of all faiths in January 2022.

Gallery

References

External links 
 Official website

Mosques in Bahrain